is a former Japanese football player. He played for the Japan national team.

Club career
Hirakawa was born in Kanagawa Prefecture on January 10, 1965. After graduating from Juntendo University, he joined Nissan Motors (later Yokohama Marinos) in 1987. From 1988 to 1990, the club won all three major title in Japan; Japan Soccer League, JSL Cup and Emperor's Cup for two years in a row. During the 1990s, the club won the 1990 JSL Cup, 1991 and 1992 Emperor's Cup. In Asia, the club won the 1991–92 and 1992–93 Asian Cup Winners' Cups. Toward the end of his career, he played for Yokohama Flügels in 1995 and Consadole Sapporo in 1996. He retired in 1996.

National team career
In March 1985, Hirakawa was selected Japan national team for 1986 World Cup qualification. At this qualification, on March 21, he debuted against North Korea. After he joined Nissan Motors, he was selected Japan again in 1988 and 1989. In 1992, he also played 1 game for the first time in 3 years. He played 13 games for Japan until 1992.

Club statistics

National team statistics

References

External links

Japan National Football Team Database

1965 births
Living people
Juntendo University alumni
Association football people from Kanagawa Prefecture
Japanese footballers
Japan international footballers
Japan Soccer League players
J1 League players
Japan Football League (1992–1998) players
Yokohama F. Marinos players
Yokohama Flügels players
Hokkaido Consadole Sapporo players
Association football midfielders
Association football defenders